Senna Proctor (born 12 August 1998 in Driffield) is a British racing driver, currently competing in the British Touring Car Championship for BTC Racing. He is the son of Mark Proctor.

Racing career

Early career

In 2014 he competed in the Ginetta Junior Championship for JHR Developments. In 2015 he competed with Team BMR. He took four wins and 13 podiums in this season, and was crowned champion after the final race of the season at Brands Hatch, but lost the title when the result was amended after the race. He graduated to the Renault Clio Cup in 2016, again with Team BMR, and finished 8th in the final championship standings.

British Touring Car Championship

It was announced on 6 December 2016 that Proctor would drive in the British Touring Car Championship for the 2017 season, with Power Maxed Racing, driving a factory supported Vauxhall Astra. Team Principal Adam Weaver, said, "I'm so excited to have Senna onboard. It's fantastic to once again be supporting young talent, as we did with Josh Cook in 2015. I think Senna will cope with the added pressure this drive brings as he seems to have a very old head on young shoulders. In Senna, we have signed a driver who we can build a long-term relationship with and turn into a future champion."

In the opening round of the season at the Brands Hatch Indy Circuit, Proctor slid off the track in wet conditions in his first BTCC qualifying session. He did manage to qualify in 16th position, however, with his teammate Tom Chilton in 12th. He ended the year 19th in the standings and claimed the Jack Sears trophy for rookie drivers.

Racing record

Complete British Touring Car Championship results
(key) (Races in bold indicate pole position – 1 point awarded just in first race; races in italics indicate fastest lap – 1 point awarded all races; * signifies that driver led race for at least one lap – 1 point given all races)

References

1998 births
Living people
British Touring Car Championship drivers
British racing drivers
People from Driffield
People educated at Scarborough College
Renault UK Clio Cup drivers
Ginetta Junior Championship drivers
JHR Developments drivers